Barret D. Jackman (born March 5, 1981) is a Canadian former professional ice hockey defenceman who played in the National Hockey League (NHL) with the St. Louis Blues and the Nashville Predators. Jackman was selected 17th overall in the 1999 NHL Entry Draft by the St. Louis Blues. Jackman was born in Trail, British Columbia and grew up in Salmo, British Columbia & later Fruitvale, British Columbia. Jackman was often known for his physical style of play and fighting abilities.

Playing career

Jackman first started playing Junior "A" and "B" with his hometown's Trail Smoke Eaters and the Beaver Valley Nitehawks in the 1996-97 season. With the Nitehawks, he captured the KIJHL Championship along with winning the Cyclone Taylor Cup; the British Columbia Junior "B" Championships in his first and only season in the juniors.

The following year he was named the youngest captain ever in the history of the Regina Pats in the Western Hockey League and played four seasons there, with 796 Penalty-In-Minutes (PIM'S) in 234 regular WHL season games played.

After playing junior and major junior hockey for five years, he got drafted in the first round; 17th overall in the 1999 NHL Entry Draft at the FleetCenter, in Boston by the St. Louis Blues.

In the 2002–03 NHL season he finished with a plus 23 rating and was among the leaders for NHL rookies in average ice time per game. Jackman won the Calder Memorial Trophy (Rookie of the Year) in 2003, narrowly beating out the Detroit Red Wings' Henrik Zetterberg and the Columbus Blue Jackets' Rick Nash.

He was sidelined by a chronic dislocated shoulder during much of the 2003–04 season, and thus played in only 15 games that season; a somewhat disappointing follow-up to his stellar rookie year.

When the NHL was locked out Jackman stayed in St. Louis and played for the Missouri River Otters. He returned to the Blues for the 2005–06 season. For the 2006–07 season Jackman set career highs in assists and points. He was a member of the 2007 Canadian IIHF World Championship team that won gold in a 4–2 win against Finland in Moscow, Russia.

On June 18, 2012, Jackman was re-signed by the Blues to a three-year contract extension.

On June 11, 2015, Jackman was informed by the Blues that his association with the club after 16 years would end, releasing him to free agency. On July 1, 2015, Jackman signed with central division rivals, the Nashville Predators on a two-year contract, worth an average of $2 million per season. In the 2015–16 season with the Predators, Jackman was a staple on the blueline, adding 5 points in 74 contests. He appeared in all 14 post-season games before the Predators were eliminated in the Conference Semi-Finals by the San Jose Sharks. After only one year in Nashville, on June 30, 2016, Jackman was placed on unconditional waivers for the purpose of buying out the final year of his contract.

Jackman officially retired on October 4, 2016, after signing a one day contract with St. Louis to retire as a member of the Blues.

Personal life
Jackman married Jenny Jackman in July 2007. They have two children together. Jackman's childhood home was used for filming in the Canadian television series Road Hockey Rumble.

Career statistics

Regular season and playoffs

International

Awards and honours

References

External links

1981 births
Living people
Calder Trophy winners
Canadian expatriate ice hockey players in the United States
Canadian ice hockey defencemen
Ice hockey people from British Columbia
Nashville Predators players
National Hockey League first-round draft picks
People from Trail, British Columbia
Regina Pats players
St. Louis Blues coaches
St. Louis Blues draft picks
St. Louis Blues players
Trail Smoke Eaters players
Worcester IceCats players